Teriakovce is a village and municipality in Prešov District in the Prešov Region of eastern Slovakia. The village was first mentioned in the historical records in 1385.

Geography

Population 
It has a population of 850 people (2020-12-31).

References

External links
http://www.statistics.sk/mosmis/eng/run.html
www.teriakovce.sk

Villages and municipalities in Prešov District
Šariš